Tus Kola (also Romanized as Ţūs Kolā; also known as Ţūs Kūlā) is a village in Qareh Toghan Rural District, in the Central District of Neka County, Mazandaran Province, Iran. At the 2006 census, its population was 1,618, in 418 families.

References 

Populated places in Neka County